The Plan is an archival compilation album of early demo recordings by British new wave band Tubeway Army (the band name originally used by Gary Numan), released in 1984.

While the demos on The Plan were originally recorded in March 1978, they remained unreleased until September 1984 when Numan's former label, Beggars Banquet Records, issued them a year after Numan left the label. In the intervening seven years since recording the demos, Numan's career had scaled great heights of commercial success and then waned. His most successful material had been similar in basic form and structure to the demos on The Plan, but had showcased a new synthesizer-based instrumentation instead of his previous punk rock sound.

In the album's liner notes, Numan states that these songs were deliberately written and recorded in the then-popular punk rock style with the express aim of securing a record deal. Some of the songs on the album (such as "Friends," "Something's in the House" and "My Shadow in Vain") formed the basis for songs that would eventually be released on Tubeway Army's debut album in 1978, subsequently rearranged and augmented with the synthesizer-based rock sound which would become the Tubeway Army/Numan trademark.

The Plan went on to do moderately well, reaching #29 on the UK album chart. Two months after The Plan'''s release, Numan issued Berserker, his first album through his own record label, Numa Records. Chart-wise, The Plan outperformed Berserker, the latter reaching #45 on the UK album chart.

All CD releases of The Plan include a wealth of bonus tracks, such as Tubeway Army's debut single  "That's Too Bad" and an early version of the Tubeway Army album track "The Life Machine."

Track listing
All tracks written by Gary Numan.

Original LP

1993 CD reissue
In 1993, Beggars Banquet issued a digitally remastered version of the album on CD, featuring 10 bonus tracks and a different running order. This release was packaged with Tubeway Army's 1979 album Replicas and was part of a series of double CDs, each of which paired two of Numan's albums together, remastered, with bonus tracks and new liner notes.

1999 CD reissue bonus tracks
In 1999, Beggars Banquet reissued the CD as a stand-alone release, newly remastered, with the further addition of two bonus tracks.

References

[ AllMusic]
 Paul Goodwin (2004). Electric Pioneer: An Armchair Guide To Gary Numan''

1984 compilation albums
Gary Numan compilation albums
Demo albums
Beggars Banquet Records compilation albums